Pagyda nebulosa is a moth of the family Crambidae described by Wileman and South in 1917. It is found in Taiwan.

References

Moths described in 1917
Pyraustinae